E85 is an ethanol fuel blend. 

E85 may also refer to:
European route E85
BMW Z4 (E85)
Odawara-Atsugi Road, route E85 in Japan

See also
E85 in the United States